Sammy Jackson  (August 18, 1937 – April 26, 1995) was an American actor, known particularly for his roles reflecting rural life, and a country music disc jockey, although he also played pop-standards during 1983 at Los Angeles's KMPC. He also recorded several 45 RPM singles in country and rockabilly styles between 1959 and 1965.

Biography and persona
Born in Henderson, North Carolina, Jackson wished to be an actor and moved to California working as a shipping clerk but was contracted to Warner Brothers where he appeared saying one line in the film No Time for Sergeants. He appeared in the syndicated American Civil War drama Gray Ghost and on the Warner Brothers Television series 77 Sunset Strip starring Efrem Zimbalist, Jr., and in the TV series Maverick, opposite James Garner in the episode "Trooper Maverick" as Private Heaven.
1973 appeared in TV series Adam 12.

No Time for Sergeants
When Jackson read that Warner Brothers was going to produce a 1964 ABC television sitcom, No Time for Sergeants, he wrote directly to Jack L. Warner saying that he was the best choice for the role and asked Warner to examine a certain Maverick episode as proof. Ten days later Jackson was told to come to the studio to test for the role. Jackson won the role over several actors including the better known Will Hutchins, a Warner Brothers television contract star who had played Sugarfoot and also had been in the No Time for Sergeants film.

The series was produced by George Burns's production company and shown in the UK on ITV from 1965 to 1969.

Other roles
Jackson also appeared in None but the Brave for Frank Sinatra as a Marine who makes friends with an enemy soldier by swapping his cigarettes for the Japanese's soldiers' fish catch. In 1966 Jackson starred in unsold  television pilots in the title role of Li'l Abner and also playing alongside Groucho Marx in 1967's Rhubarb. Jackson also had a role in The Night of the Grizzly, both feature films had Howard W. Koch as a producer.

With film roles for "hillbillies" drying up, Jackson began working on-air in radio in 1968 while also acting in a number of motion pictures and doing guest roles in television series. Television writer Larry Brody recalled meeting Jackson and writing a television pilot for him. In the 1980s, Jackson worked for a radio station in Las Vegas and briefly played country music on KLAC, Los Angeles. In 1992, he appeared in the pilot film, Casino (not to be confused with the better-known movie, Casino). 

Sammy Jackson died of heart failure at the age of 57 in 1995.

Partial filmography
No Time for Sergeants (1958) - Inductee (uncredited)
None but the Brave (1965) - Cpl. Craddock
The Night of the Grizzly (1966) - Cal Curry
The Fastest Guitar Alive (1967) - Steve
The Boatniks (1970) - Garlotti
Norwood (1970) - Wayne T.E.B. Walker
The Million Dollar Duck (1971) - Frisby
Country Music (1972) - Himself
Shame, Shame on the Bixby Boys (1978)
Another Stakeout (1993) - Gaetano (final film role)

References

External links
 

1937 births
1995 deaths
Male actors from North Carolina
American radio personalities
American male film actors
American male television actors
People from Henderson, North Carolina
20th-century American male actors